Yi Byeong-gi (1891-1968), pen name Garam, was a Korean independence fighter. He opposed the Japanese colonial rule by promoting the use of the genuine Korean alphabet. He created the journal Munjang (Literary Style) where he promoted the modern Korean poetry, but also serialized many classics like  Hanjungnok (Feb. 1939-Jan. 1940) and Inhyeon syeongmo minsi deokhaengnok 63 jangbon (1940). As a member of the Korean Language Society, he was jailed in 1942 by the Japanese occupation forces.

After the recovery of Korean Independence, he established the Garam Library in the Seoul National University. He collected and commented massive amounts of Korean literature from the past. Among these gems, and beside Hanjungnok and Inhyeon wanghu jeon, there are "Yolowonyahwagi" and "Chunhyangga".

References
Upright Korean poet Yi Byeong-gi

Garam Yi Byeong-gi

 Hanjungnok, Kim Jahyun Haboush ed, esp. note 69, p36

Literature Translation Institute of Korea, 2019/10/13, Inhyeon wanghu jeon

 Yi Byeong-gi at Encyclopedia of Korean Culture 

 
1891 births
1968 deaths
Date of birth missing
Date of death missing
Place of birth missing
Place of death missing
Korean independence activists
South Korean activists
Korean literature academics
Members of the National Academy of Sciences of the Republic of Korea